High Street is a major thoroughfare in Central Ohio, predominantly in Franklin County and Columbus. It stretches from the northern border of Columbus in Delaware County south to the southern boundary of Franklin County just past Columbus's municipal boundaries. The street is considered one of Columbus's two main roads, along with Broad Street.

Route description

High Street extends north and south far into Ohio, though it is named High Street starting at the northern end of Columbus (in Delaware County). North of this it is U.S. Route 23. Continuing south, the road quickly enters Franklin County and passes through some northerly suburbs in Columbus. The road enters Worthington and Riverlea, two municipalities that are enclaves of Columbus. The street is the primary corridor of Worthington's central business district. High Street resumes in Columbus, going through its Clintonville neighborhood. There it adjusts from running approximately due south to slightly southeast. It continues through Old North Columbus and then the University District, where it also passes by the Ohio State University. Immediately afterward, it enters the Short North Arts District, a historic and shopping district centered around High Street. The road continues into Downtown Columbus. There the street enters Capitol Square, intersecting with Broad Street, the other main artery of the city. The square is the cultural center of downtown, and includes the Ohio Statehouse, the state capitol building. High Street continues south out of Downtown through the Brewery District by German Village, and readjusts more south upon entering Merion Village. It continues through a large stretch of the city's South Side, where it terminates just south of the city borders in Hamilton Township, continuing on as U.S. Route 23.

History

High Street has been one of Columbus's two main corridors since its founding, along with Broad Street, meeting at a 100 percent corner downtown. The street (among other main corridors) was laid out from the city's founding in 1812 into the following year.  These streets and the entire grid were laid out 12 degrees off from a north-south and east-west alignment.

High Street is likely named for the high ridge along which it was laid out.

Attributes

The city's street plan follows a grid pattern with the intersection of Broad and High Streets at its center. The address system begins its numbering at the intersection of Broad and High, with numbers increasing in magnitude with distance from Broad or High, as well as cardinal directions used alongside street names.

Only Broad Street was wider, at 120 feet, while most others were 82.5 feet, and alleys were 33 feet wide.

For public transportation, numerous Central Ohio Transit Authority (COTA) routes utilize High Street. Routes 2 E Main / N High and 102, and the Night Owl run on a long extent of the street; the 102 is a limited-stop service, while the Night Owl provides late-night service.

Beside the historic landmarks listed below, the street has numerous cultural landmarks and attractions. These include Highbanks Metro Park, the Pontifical College Josephinum, the Newport Music Hall, the Ohio State University, the university's Billy Ireland Cartoon Library & Museum, the Greater Columbus Convention Center, the Lazarus Building, and the Franklin County Government Center.

Historical landmarks

Buildings on High Street can have one of several types of official landmark designations:
 The Columbus Register of Historic Properties (CRHP) is the city-wide historic register. The city's Historic Resources Commission and Historic Preservation Office are responsible for identifying and designating its landmarks and the buildings in the city's historic districts.
 The National Register of Historic Places (NRHP) is the United States federal government's official list of districts, sites, buildings, structures and objects deemed worthy of preservation for their historical significance.
 The National Historic Landmark (NHL) program focuses on places of significance in American history, architecture, engineering, or culture; all NHL sites are also on the NRHP.

Individual landmarks 
Below is a list of historic sites on High Street, from north to south. Buildings within historic districts, but no individual landmark designation, are not included in this table.

Historic districts 
There are numerous historic districts through which High Street passes. From north to south, the districts are:

 Worthington Historic District, a national historic district
 Old Beechwold, a city and national historic district
 North Columbus Commercial Historic District, a national historic district
 Northwood Park, a city historic district
 Near Northside Historic District, a national historic district (overlaps with Victorian Village)
 Victorian Village, a city historic district
 Fifth Avenue and North High Historic District, a national historic district (mostly within Victorian Village)
 Italian Village, a city historic district
 Old North End Historic District, a national historic district
 Third Avenue and North High Historic District, a national historic district (mostly within Italian Village)
 Short North Historic District, a national historic district
 North Market Historic District, a city and national historic district
 High and Gay Streets Historic District, a national historic district
 South High Commercial Historic District, a city and national historic district
 Brewery District, a city historic district (German Village is one block over)
 Schlee Brewery Historic District, a national historic district
 Hartman Stock Farm Historic District, a national historic district

See also

 Geography of Columbus, Ohio

References

External links 
 

Streets in Ohio
Transportation in Columbus, Ohio

High Streets